Pellaea rotundifolia, the button fern, is a species of fern endemic to New Zealand, where it grows in scrub and forests. It is also a popular garden plant (in zones 8 and 9) and house plant, tolerating low temperatures but not freezing.

The Latin specific epithet rotundifolia means “round-leaved”.

Cultivation
It needs acidic and well-drained soil; it does not appreciate the moist, humid conditions that most ferns require so does well with minimal watering.

This plant has gained the Royal Horticultural Society’s Award of Garden Merit.

References

 Sp. fil. 2:136. 1858.
 G. Brownlie, "Cyto-Taxonomic Studies on New Zealand Pteridaceae", New Phytologist, Vol. 56, No. 2 (Jul., 1957), pp. 207–209.
 Gerald J. Gastony and David R. Rollo, "Phylogeny and Generic Circumscriptions of Cheilanthoid Ferns (Pteridaceae: Cheilanthoideae) Inferred from rbcL Nucleotide Sequences", American Fern Journal, Vol. 85, No. 4, Use of Molecular Data in Evolutionary Studies of Pteridophytes (Oct. - Dec., 1995), pp. 341–360.
 Nico Vermeulen, Encyclopedia of House Plants, Taylor & Francis, 1999, pages 22–23. .

rotundifolia
Ferns of New Zealand
Endemic flora of New Zealand
Garden plants of New Zealand
House plants